Columbus State may refer to:

Columbus State Community College, a community college in Columbus, Ohio
Columbus State University, a state university in Columbus, Georgia